Pszów  is a town in Wodzisław County, Silesian Voivodeship, Poland, with 13,896 inhabitants (2019). It is located on Rybnik Plateau (Płaskowyż Rybnicki), in close vicinity to such cities, as Rybnik, Wodzisław Śląski, Racibórz, Radlin, Rydułtowy, Jastrzębie-Zdrój and Żory.

History
First mention of Pszów comes from 1265, when, called then Psov, it was granted Magdeburg rights. The first wooden church was built in the town in 1293. Across the centuries, Pszów shared the fate of Upper Silesia, belonging to Kingdom of Poland, Kingdom of Bohemia, Habsburg monarchy, Kingdom of Prussia, and German Empire. Following the Silesian Uprisings, in 1922 Pszów became part of Second Polish Republic. Incorporated as a city in 1954, it now is a part of the Rybnik Coal Area. Coal Mine Rydułtowy-Anna is located on the territory of Pszów and Rydułtowy.

Sport
Pszów has one sport club – Górnik Pszów, founded in 1924. It is most famous for boxers, such as Andrzej Biegalski, Bogdan Gajda (gold medal at 1977 European Amateur Boxing Championships), and Zbigniew Kicka (bronze medal at 1974 World Amateur Boxing Championships).

Twin towns – sister cities

Pszów is twinned with:
 Horní Benešov, Czech Republic

References

External links
Official website

Cities and towns in Silesian Voivodeship
Wodzisław County